Klamath Agency is an unincorporated community in Klamath County, Oregon, United States, on Oregon Route 62 where Agency Creek enters Crooked Creek.

Klamath Agency was an Indian agency for the Klamath Indian Reservation established May 12, 1866, on the shore of Agency Lake. The Klamath Reservation was terminated in 1961, but the community at Klamath Agency still exists. Klamath Agency post office was established in 1878 and ran until 1965, when the mail was instead routed to Chiloquin.

In 1870, there was a sawmill at the agency; it burned down in 1911. In the 1890s, Klamath Agency was the site of two Indian boarding schools—one for boys and one for girls.

In 1945, Ray Enouf Field was dedicated at the agency. The airfield was named in honor of the only Klamath Indian to die in World War II. Raymond L. Enouf was a Marine private first class, who was killed while acting as a medic in the front lines during the Battle of Iwo Jima.

The Klamath Agency is now home of the Sage Community Charter School.

See also
Klamath Tribes
Indian termination policy

References

External links
Historic image of Klamath Agency from Salem Public Library

Unincorporated communities in Klamath County, Oregon
Klamath
1866 establishments in Oregon
Populated places established in 1866
Unincorporated communities in Oregon